Yamoussa Camara (born c. 1953) is a Malian soldier and politician.

Education and career
He graduate from the École Normale Supérieure in Bamako and the Ecole Superieure de la Guerre (Tunis 2006-2007), he also holds several certificates and patents. His military career led him to the joins the military school in Koulikoro. In 1981, he was promoted to the rank of second lieutenant.

He served as the director of Prytanée Militaire in Kati from February 1996 to 30 March 2000 and later Chief of Staff of the National Guard from May 2011 to 22 March 2012. From 24 April 2012 to 5 March 2014, he served as the Malian Minister of Defence and Veteran Affairs.

References

Defense ministers of Mali
Living people
Year of birth missing (living people)
21st-century Malian people